"Got to Get" is a song by Swedish electronic dance music duo Rob'n'Raz featuring singer-songwriter and rapper Leila K. Released in 1989 as her debut single, it was also the lead single from their only album together, Rob'n'Raz featuring Leila K (1990). It was very successful in Europe, reaching the top 10 in at least nine countries, like the UK, where it peaked at number eight in November same year. The song also charted in the US, Canada and Australia. Two different music videos were made to accompany it.

Background
Leila K was discovered by Rob'n'Raz when singing in a music contest. They liked her music and offered her a recording contract in 1988. With them she would get her first hit the following year with "Got to Get". It was first recorded within the UK as a pre-production demo by Pete Towns of P&P Productions. In 1990, the album Rob'n'Raz featuring Leila K was released, featuring "Got to Get".

Chart performance
"Got to Get" was a sizeable hit on the charts in Europe, but also charted in Australia, Canada and the US. It was a number-one hit in Iceland, peaked at number two in the Netherlands, and number three in Austria, Switzerland and West Germany. In the UK, it reached its highest position as number eight on the UK Singles Chart in November 1989. It was a top 10 hit also in Belgium (5), Finland (10), Norway (4) and in Leila K's native Sweden (9). Additionally, "Got to Get" entered the top 20 in both Denmark (14) and Ireland (14), as well as on the Eurochart Hot 100, where it reached number 11 in March 1990. Outside Europe, the single made its way to number 48 on the Billboard Hot 100 in the US and number 57 in Australia, where it spent a total of 20 weeks within the top 100. "Got to Get" also entered the top 10 on the Canadian RPM Dance/Urban chart.

Critical reception
A reviewer from Billboard described the song as "explosive" and "an infectious club-inspired stomper". The magazine's Bill Coleman stated that "as infectious, house-inflected pop/rap goes, this track wins on its own." Ernest Hardy from Cashbox wrote, "The inevitable Neneh Cherry clone arrives with a swiftness that in itself is awe-inspiring. Vocally, this well could be Miss Cherry. There’s the oh-so-slight hint of a rasp, coupled with sass and lots of ’tude." Mick Mercer from Melody Maker complimented it as a "little fun bundle". Pan-European magazine Music & Media commented, "The world will soon wake up to this 17-year-old female rapper from Gothenburg who can easily compete with artists like Neneh Cherry or the Cookie Crew." NME said, "God knows who Rob 'n' Raz are, but Leila K is a Swedish black woman who sounds like Neneh Cherry! Well, shipmates! Blow me down if that ain't a merry coincidence! This record is jaunty but unremarkable, like a pigeon." Taylor Dayne, reviewing the song for Number One, remarked that "this girl sounds exactly like Neneh Cherry. So does the production." She also declared it as "a happening record and everything and you can dance to it".

Music video
There were produced two different music videos to promote the single. One of them was directed by Scottish director Paul Boyd. Later they were published on Leila K's official YouTube channel in April 2009.

Personnel
David Thomas - Stylist
Robert Dexter - Assistant stylist

Versions
 Club Version 5:15
 Radio Edit 4:30
 Instrumental 4:16
 Single Version 3:45
 Extended Mix 4:26
 SweMix 5:40
 Nordik Beat Remix 5:31
 Stone's Nordik Swing Theory 4:42

Charts

References

External links

1989 debut singles
1989 songs
English-language Swedish songs
Leila K songs
Music videos directed by Paul Boyd
Number-one singles in Iceland
Rob'n'Raz songs
Songs written by Leila K